Jimbalakudunj is a small Aboriginal community located approximately  north west of Fitzroy Crossing in the Kimberley region of Western Australia, within the Shire of Derby–West Kimberley.

Jimbalakudunj occupies a unique location in the West Kimberley settlement pattern in the sense that it is proximate to the midway point between the coastal regional centres of Broome/Derby and the inland regional centre of Fitzroy Crossing.

History 

Jimbalakudunj was established in the early 1990s by members of the Nargoodah family moving away from Noonkanbah and Fitzroy Crossing onto Paradise Downs Station. An entity to manage the affairs of the community was established in 199.

Native title 

The community is located within the SDWK Nyikina Mangala (WI2005/001) Indigenous land use agreement area.

Governance 

The community is managed through its incorporated body, Jimbalakudunj Aboriginal Corporation, incorporated under the Aboriginal Councils and Associations Act 1976 on 27 May 1991.

Town planning 

Jimbalakudunj Layout Plan No.1 has been prepared in accordance with State Planning Policy 3.2 Aboriginal Settlements. Layout Plan No.1 was endorsed by.

Notes

External links 
 Office of the Registrar of Indigenous Corporations
 Native Title Indigenous Land Use Agreement summary

Towns in Western Australia
Aboriginal communities in Kimberley (Western Australia)